Spooky is the second studio album by English rock band Lush. It was released on 27 January 1992 by 4AD. The album, produced by Robin Guthrie of Cocteau Twins, followed the band's debut mini album, Scar (1989), several extended play releases, and the compilation album Gala (1990). Spooky reached the UK Top 10 and topped the national indie charts. The album produced three singles: "Nothing Natural", "For Love" and "Superblast!".

Reception

In 2016, Pitchfork ranked Spooky at number 27 on its list of "The 50 Best Shoegaze Albums of All Time". In the album's entry, Paula Mejia said:

Track listing

Release history

Singles
"Black Spring EP" (29 October 1991)
CD BAD 1016 (US only, Reprise Records 9 40231-2)
 "Nothing Natural" – 5:56
 "God's Gift" – 4:10
 "Monochrome" – 5:07
 "Nothing Natural (Version)" – 3:59
"For Love" (30 December 1991)
CD (BAD 2001 CD); 10" vinyl (BAD D 2001); 12" vinyl (BAD 2001)
 "For Love" – 3:32
 "Starlust" – 4:21
 "Outdoor Miner" – 2:46 (Wire cover)
 "Astronaut" – 2:37
"Superblast!" (Promo-only, January 1992)
Radio promo CD (PRO-CD-5471)
 "Superblast! (Gil Norton Remix)" – 4:04
 "Starlust" – 4:21
 "Fallin' in Love" – 2:38 (Dennis Wilson cover)
 "Superblast! (Album Version)" – 4:08

Personnel
Lush
 Miki Berenyi – vocals, guitar
 Emma Anderson – guitar, vocals
 Steve Rippon – bass
 Chris Acland – drums

Charts

References

Lush (band) albums
1992 debut albums
Albums produced by Robin Guthrie
4AD albums